Scum of the Earth! (also known as Sam Flynn) is a 1963 American exploitation film directed by Herschell Gordon Lewis and produced by David F. Friedman. It is credited as being the first film in the "roughie" genre.

Synopsis 

An innocent college student, Kim Sherwood (Downe), is lured into doing "glamour" poses to earn money for tuition. Once she has done this work she is blackmailed by the photographers into doing more and more explicit posing. Various forms of implied sexual violence follow until the girl is rescued from her desperate situation.

Cast 

 William Kerwin as Harmon Johnson (as Thomas Sweetwood)
 Allison Louise Downe as Kim Sherwood (as Vickie Miles)
 Lawrence J. Aberwood as Lang (as Lawrence Wood)
 Sandra Sinclair as Sandy (as Sandy Sinclair)
 Mal Arnold as Larry
 Craig Maudslay Jr. as Ajax
 Christy Foushee as Marie (as Toni Calvert)
 Doug Brennan as Carl
 Christina Castel as Cindy, the model
 Edward Mann as Mr. Sherwood
 Lou Youngman as Dave, punk in diner
 William Caulder as Joe, punk in diner

Production 

In his autobiography, David F. Friedman wrote that Scum of the Earth was shot in six days, just two weeks after filming on Blood Feast had ended and was filmed in most of the same Miami and Miami Beach locations as in the previous film. It was filmed in black-and-white not to save money, but to intentionally give it a dirty look, "like an old, scratched 16 mm stag film." Friedman had the idea of promoting the film a week before its showing by giving theater audiences comic books of the story.

Critical reception 
Allmovie wrote, "Unintentionally funny and poorly photographed, this film certainly has its moments for connoisseurs of bad cinema, but others will find it tawdry and dull."

Availability 
Something Weird Video released Scum of the Earth on DVD with The Defilers (1964) on 20 February 2001. It is also available on the Arrow Video Blu-ray release of Blood Feast (1963) as a special feature.

See also
List of American films of 1963

References

External links 
 
 

1963 films
1960s erotic films
American erotic films
American sexploitation films
Films directed by Herschell Gordon Lewis
1960s English-language films
1960s American films